Tinissa poliophasma is a moth of the family Tineidae. It was described by John David Bradley in 1965 and is found in Uganda.

References

Endemic fauna of Uganda
Moths described in 1965
Scardiinae
Insects of Uganda
Moths of Africa